The Battle of Wadi Musa was a battle fought between the Arab Army and the Ottoman Empire during the Arab Revolt of 1916–1918.

The battle began when General Djemal Pasha ordered his forces to secure the Hejaz Railway by "any and all means". The Ottoman Army at Ma'an was sent to deal with the North Arab Army. The Ottomans were ambushed by 700 Arab troops, inflicting heavy casualties and capturing 300 men. The remaining Ottoman forces retreated, leaving the railway uncaptured.

References

Sources

External links
 History of the Syrian Arab Army
 The Arab Revolt 1916-18, Lawrence sets Arabia ablaze

Wadi Musa
1917 in Ottoman Syria
Wadi Musa
Wadi Musa
October 1917 events